Terence Anthony "Terry" Sue-Patt (19 September 1964 – circa May 2015) was a British actor, best known for playing Benny Green in the BBC series Grange Hill (1978–1982).

Early life
Sue-Patt was born in Islington, London, one of the six children of Alston, of Chinese and Jamaican descent, and May (née Stewart) Sue-Patt, of Jamaican and Scottish descent. He attended Sir William Collins Comprehensive School, and the Anna Scher Theatre School. Scher had been Sue-Patt's English teacher while he was at Ecclesbourne junior school before she opened her drama school.

Career
Sue-Patt began his acting career with small parts in various Children's Film Foundation productions, a part in the 1973 public information film Lonely Water, and an appearance in General Hospital for ATV. He was given the part of Benny Green in Grange Hill after being spotted at his local drama group and playing football in the local park by Colin Cant, the series' original director. His character was the first pupil seen on screen in the first episode. "I basically played myself in Grange Hill", he later recalled. "There weren't many black actors about on TV at that time. I had a great time, getting time off school to play football. It was a bit of a dream come true, really."

He also played a gunman in the Channel 4 Desmond's in 1990 (which featured an in-joke about his role in Grange Hill), and the BBC Schools programme, Scene (1990s). Sue-Patt played the role of Yusef in Alan Clarke's The Firm (1989).

Death
Sue-Patt's death was announced on Twitter and his Facebook profile on 22 May 2015. Scotland Yard confirmed that officers had forced entry into a flat in Walthamstow after concerns were raised about the welfare of the occupant; however, the death was not treated as suspicious. It was reported that Sue-Patt may have died up to a month before his body was discovered.

References

External links
 

1964 births
2015 deaths
Male actors from London
People from Islington (district)
English male child actors
English male television actors
Alumni of the Anna Scher Theatre School
Black British male actors
English people of Jamaican descent
English people of Chinese descent
English people of Scottish descent